Little Bampton is a village in Cumbria situated 6 miles outside the market town of Wigton and 8 miles west of Carlisle, England. The village comprises approximately 40 houses, some dating back to the 18th century. The village does not have a hall or a Church, but its meeting place is the Pub called 'The Tam O'Shanter'. In 1870-72 the township had a population of 172.

References

Villages in Cumbria
Kirkbampton